Acco is a genus of moths in the family Erebidae.

Species
 Acco albipuncta de Vos & van Mastrigt, 2007
 Acco bicolora Bethune-Baker, 1904
 Acco fasciata de Vos & van Mastrigt, 2007
 Acco postmetallica de Vos & van Mastrigt, 2007

References
 Entomofauna 28(18): 213-240
 Natural History Museum Lepidoptera generic names catalog

Nudariina
Moth genera